The Margaret Morse Nice Medal is an ornithological award made annually by the Wilson Ornithological Society (WOS).  It was established in 1997 and named in honour of ornithologist Margaret Morse Nice (1883-1974).  The medal recipient is expected to give the plenary lecture at the WOS annual general meeting.

Recipients
Source: Wilson Ornithological Society
 1997 – Elsie Collias and Nick Collias (University of California, Los Angeles), "Seeking to understand the living bird"
 1998 – Ellen Ketterson and Val Nolan (Indiana University), "Studying birds: one species at a time"
 1999 – Frances C. James
 2000 – Susan M. Smith 
 2001 – Glen E. Woolfenden
 2002 – Richard T. Holmes
 2003 – Robert E. Ricklefs
 2004 – Stephen T. Emlen
 2005 – Bridget J. M. Stutchbury and Eugene S. Morton
 2006 – Gary Stiles
 2007 – Patricia L. Schwagmeyer and Douglas Mock
 2008 – Jerome Jackson
 2009 – Sidney A. Gauthreaux (Clemson University), "Bird movements in the atmosphere: discoveries from radar and visual studies"
 2010 – Robert B. Payne and Laura Payne (University of Michigan), "Brood parasitism in cuckoos, cowbirds, and African finches"
 2011 – Richard N. Conner (USDA-Forest Service (retired)), "The ecology of the Red-cockaded Woodpecker, by necessity a multidiscipline study"
 2012 – Peter R. Grant & B. Rosemary Grant (Princeton University), "A long-term study of Darwin's Finches"
 2013 – Edward Burtt, Jr. (Ohio Wesleyan University), "From passion to science to the evolution of avian color"
 2014 – Don Kroodsma (University of Massachusetts-Amherst), "Birdsong: the hour before dawn"
 2015 – Erica H. Dunn (Environment Canada}, "Bird observatories: Diversity and opportunity"
 2016 – John C. Wingfield (Department of Neurobiology, Physiology and Behavior University of California), "Nomads, pioneers and fugitives: on the move in a capricious world"
 2017 – Frank R. Moore (University of Southern Mississippi), "Stopover biology of migratory songbirds: challenges, consequences and connections"
 2018 – Reed Bowman (Archbold Biological Station), "Change on the long-term study of the Florida Scrub-Jay: A fifty-year perspective"
 2019 – Robert L. Curry (Villanova University), "Transformation of familiar birds into model organisms: what chickadees can teach us"
 2020 – Bette A. Loiselle (University of Florida) "Three decades of studying Neotropical birds: lessons learned along the way"
 2021 – Ellen Ketterson (Indiana University) "Long term research on an ordinary extraordinary songbird: the dark-eyed junco"
 2022 – Chris Rimmer (Executive Director, Vermont Center for Ecostudies) "Bicknell’s Thrush: Scientific surprises and conservation connections across the hemisphere"

See also

 List of ornithology awards

References

Ornithology awards
Awards established in 1997